The Audio Of Being is the fourth and final album by the Canadian rock group Matthew Good Band, released in 2001.  It included  two singles: "Carmelina" and "Anti-Pop". The album sold 73,000 units in Canada by March 2003 and was certified Gold the same month.

Recording
Matthew Good has stated that the recording process for the album was a "nightmare". He claims it started during the rehearsals of the songs for the album, due to the process being hampered with band members trying to inject ideas into the songs so they could make a case for publishing credits. In addition to that, Good was very ill during much of the recording sessions.

"Anti-Pop" was not originally recorded for the album. After the recording sessions were finished, the band's label requested that the band record another song that could be released as a single. In response, Good wrote "Anti-Pop", which the band then recorded and was later released as the second single from the album. Two songs that were recorded during the sessions were not included on the album. "All Together", which was featured on the original track listing of the album in July 2001, was later removed from the album. "Pony Boy" was also excluded from the album, but was later included on Good's 2005 compilation album, In a Coma.

Good's opinions
Good has claimed to not be thrilled with the end result of the album. In a 2003 interview with Billboard, Good stated that the album was "so far away from what I had envisioned." He later said on his blog that he felt there are some good songs on it (specifically noting "Sort of a Protest Song"). He rearranged songs from The Audio of Being for Rooms, the second disc of In a Coma.

Special editions
Three different packages were released, in black, white and grey. Each included a special booklet with the CD case that had lyrics to all Matthew Good Band songs to date. The words "kept", "in the" or "dark" appeared on the spine of the jewel case depending on the colour, which would line up if all 3 were put together. "Help us get rid of the Matthew Good Band" appears on the hubs of the discs.

Track listing 
All tracks written by Matthew Good, except where noted.

Year-end charts

References

2001 albums
Matthew Good albums
Universal Music Canada albums
Albums produced by Warne Livesey